The 1996 Bucknell Bison football team was an American football team that represented Bucknell University during the 1996 NCAA Division I-AA football season. Bucknell won the Patriot League championship, its first. 

In their second year under head coach Tom Gadd, the Bison compiled a 6–5 record. George Howanitz, Rich Lemon and Brandon Little were the team captains.

The Bison outscored opponents 234 to 223. Their 4–1 conference record topped the six-team Patriot League standings. 

Bucknell played its home games at Christy Mathewson–Memorial Stadium on the university campus in Lewisburg, Pennsylvania.

Schedule

References

Bucknell
Bucknell Bison football seasons
Patriot League football champion seasons
Bucknell Bison football